LGBT culture in St. Louis is strongly influenced by larger regional divisions, such as racial division and the city/county divide. Recorded history and resource flow have tended to prioritize white individuals and the city's central corridor, creating a perception of LGBT culture in St. Louis that does not always align with regional demographics. For the purposes of this article, St. Louis describes the metropolitan area, including neighboring counties in Missouri and Illinois.

Despite many cases of injustice in the past, St. Louis is nowadays regarded as a suitable city for LGBT individuals. It is a progressive and very liberal city, and holds several "gayborhoods," like The Grove, as well as many LGBT organizations. In 2019, Realtor.com dubbed St. Louis the 8th most LGBT-friendly city.

Pride festivals 
There are three different LGBT Pride festivals every year in St. Louis city. St. Louis PrideFest takes place at Soldiers' Memorial downtown over two days in the last weekend of June. PrideFest previously took place in Tower Grove Park with a parade on South Grand Avenue until 2013. Neighborhood residents established Tower Grove Pride to continue the neighborhood festivities, which annually occurs on the Saturday of the same weekend. St. Louis Black Pride takes place in August, and is believed to be the second oldest Black pride in the country. The first Trans & Gender-Free Pride March preceded the PrideFest and Tower Grove celebrations in June 2019.

Other pride festivals in the metro area include Pride St. Charles in St. Charles, Missouri and Metro East PrideFest in Belleville, Illinois.

Legal protections 

In 2019, Missouri was ranked in the lowest category of the HRC state equality index “High Priority to Achieve Basic Equality” with 28 other states. The statewide laws and policies identified as beneficial for LGBTQ populations are hate crime laws, a non-discrimination law specific to college and universities, non-discrimination policy for state employees on the basis of sexual orientation, an anti-cyber bullying law, transgender inclusion in sports, and changes for name and gender marker on drivers licenses.

St. Louis City Ordinance No. 67119 extends the city anti-discrimination policy to protect individuals on the basis of gender identity and sexuality. The Civil Rights Enforcement Agency (CREA) is responsible for processing claims.

St. Louis County also has anti-discrimination protections for LGBT residents. In 2017, a sergeant in St. Louis County Police Department filed an EEOC discrimination lawsuit alleging that he was told to "tone down your gayness" in order to be eligible for promotion. Shortly thereafter he was transferred to another precinct and assigned to night shift. St. Louis County argued against the case on the basis that discrimination against sexual minorities is not illegal in Missouri. The officer agreed to a $10.25 million settlement in 2020.

History

pre-1950 
Prior to European colonization, the region was inhabited by members of the Mississippian, Illini, Missouria, and Osage peoples. Understandings of gender and sexuality differ among indigenous cultures. While much ancestral knowledge has been lost through colonization and forced assimilation, it is known that the Osage recognized Mixu'ga, one of the identities under the modern two-spirit umbrella. Despite the Indian Removal Act and other attempts to displace indigenous people, members of the Osage nation continue to reside in the area and are working to preserve Sugarloaf Mound.

A St. Louis medical textbook publisher released The Story of a Life, the first recognized American homosexual autobiography in 1901. The author, using the pseudonym Claude Hartland, wrote about his mental health and experiences with doctors related to sexuality and gender identity as well as descriptions of homosexual social life in downtown St. Louis.

1950-1960s 
In the late 1950s, a competition for "female impersonators" called Miss Fannie's Ball was organized by the Jolly Jesters social club, with proceeds going to St. Louis African American institutions. The event is a continuing annual Halloween night celebration that has been hosted at various venues, including Masonic Prince Hall Grand Lodge and Chase Park Plaza.

During the Halloween festivities of 1969, nine young people were arrested without explanation while leaving the Onyx Room, one of the most popular gay bars of the time. At the station they were charged for "masquerading" (i.e. appearing publicly in women's clothing). Dressing in clothing not in accordance with one's perceived sex had been prohibited by a municipal ordinance since 1864. Arrests at LGBT establishments were common, but the events of that Halloween ignited the first recorded protest by gay activists in St. Louis. The Mandrake Society, the first gay rights group of St. Louis, mobilized the community. They spread news of the arrests by phone to gather supporters at police headquarters, assisted with bail, and hired legal representation. The charges were eventually dropped, marking a significant victory for St. Louis gay rights activists. The 1969 Halloween arrests are sometimes referred to as "St. Louis' Stonewall" because of its importance as a flash-point of community resistance and organization.

In 1968, Laud Humphreys presented his research on male-male sexual activities in public restrooms in Forest Park, later published as the controversial Tearoom Trade.

1970-1980s 
Places known to be gathering sites for lesbians, including a bar and coffeehouse in south city, were firebombed in the 1970s.

In 1972, Goldstein Johnson challenged the city's masquerading law with support from the ACLU of Missouri. Johnson had been arrested twice and served 45 days at the city workhouse for wearing women's clothes. Johnson was murdered before a decision could be made. More than 200 masquerading arrests were made from 1970 up to when the law was successfully overturned in 1986.

Various pride marches and demonstrations were organized throughout the 1970s. Chuck Charleston, a bartender at Red Bull in East St. Louis, organized a procession of cars that ended in a large gathering in Forest Park in 1971. Student organizations held celebrations and hosted nationally known activists at Washington University in St. Louis and Southern Illinois University Edwardsville. Metropolitan Community Church in St. Louis was established in 1972 with a mission to serve the gay and lesbian community. The church served as a center for organizing and hosted a gay pride rally in 1977. The first city sanctioned Celebration of Lesbian and Gay Pride occurred April 12–20, 1980, with a full week of activities, ending with the landmark Walk for Charity and Rally. Sponsors included community and ally businesses as well as religious organizations. Some participants used pseudonyms or wore disguises in fear of reprisal.

St. Louis Effort for AIDS was established by volunteers in 1985, raising money to support people affected by HIV/AIDS through Dining Out For Life and drag shows.

In 1989, the organization Blacks Assisting Blacks Against AIDS (BABAA) was established to educate the St. Louis African American community about HIV/AIDS. They later found a physical office and did educational outreach, including distributing condoms at clubs.

1990-2000s 
In 1990, the St. Louis Gender Foundation began public outreach, including HIV/AIDS education and a booth at Pride. They had previously met privately as Tri-Ess or the Gateway Femmes.

University of Missouri–St. Louis was among the first to recognize LGBT History Month, founded by graduate student Rodney Wilson in 1994.

In 1995, BABAA and other African American community members organized B-Boy Blues Festival, and in 1999 established the annual St. Louis Black Pride.

Gayborhoods

Historical 
St. Louis's gayborhoods have a rocky history at best. In the mid-twentieth century, gay neighborhoods were shaped by redlining and white flight. Due to discriminatory practices and social marginalization, white gay establishments emerged in the liminal spaces between predominately white and predominately black neighborhoods. Laud Humphreys described such areas as "gay ghettos" where black neighborhoods provided the protection of anonymity to white gay men. Black gays and lesbians lacked such privilege and also faced discrimination from their white counterparts that often limited their socializing to private parties. For all LGBTQ St. Louisans then, employment and housing discrimination often excluded them from the suburbs or affluent neighborhoods.

Midtown 
This neighborhood includes the former entertainment district known as Gaslight Square. From the 1930s to the 1970s, Grand and Olive was the most continuously popular part of the city for lesbian and gay establishments. Among them was Dante's Inferno, one of the oldest identified gay bars in St. Louis, notorious for hosting drag shows. The gay bars were in close proximity to Black residential neighborhoods, however many businesses refused to serve black clientele. The bar Zebra marketed itself as a multiracial space, "a beautiful blend of black and white." This area was also the site of the Onyx Room police raid.

Central West End 
During the 1950s-1970s the Central West End also became a hub for LGBT nightlife and came to be known as St. Louis's original gayborhood. In 1969 the Mandrake Society was founded in the Central West End. They, and other homophile organizations, often met at Trinity Episcopal Church in the early 70s. "The Center," operated by the Metropolitan Life Services Corporation, was located at 4940 McPherson Avenue and hosted a library, community meetings, and counseling services from 1976-1978. The vegetarian cafe collective Sunshine Inn operated in the neighborhood 1972-1998 and hosted the 1987 national meeting for National Coalition of Black Lesbians and Gays.

From the 1970s through the 1990s, however, the Central West End was subject to gentrification. As a result, members of the LGBT community moved away from the area and many LGBT establishments were forced to close. Coffee Cartel was closely aligned with the community and frequent sponsor of LGBT events until its closure in 2018. LGBT-owned Left Bank Books has been located on Euclid Avenue since 1969.

North St. Louis 
Northside establishments primarily catering to black gays and lesbians included 1960s Bills Bar and Grill, which was a critical venue for Ethel Sawyer's sociology masters thesis, “A Study of a Public Lesbian Community.”

Present-day

The Grove 
Between the 1990s and 2010s, the Grove, in Forest Park Southeast, became the "heir apparent" to the Central West End's LGBT club scene. Although the Grove remains the most high-profile gayborhood in St. Louis, the rise of mainstream venues and other markers of gentrification have raised alarms among the LGBTQ community that the history of the Central West End may be repeating itself. In addition to gay bars, the Pride Center and Transgender Memorial Garden are located in the neighborhood.

Tower Grove 
The neighborhoods around Tower Grove Park have long been a popular area for LGBT residents. The organizing group of the 1980 pride activities was the Magnolia Committee, named after Magnolia Street on the north side of the park. In addition to the annual Tower Grove Pride festivities, many LGBT businesses line the street on South Grand.

Soulard 
Until 2014, the longest operating gay bar in St. Louis, Clementines, was located in Soulard. Clementines was one of several gay bars to be established in Soulard in the 1970s and 1980s when many buildings in the neighborhood were abandoned and property values were low. Many bars in the area are gay friendly and host drag shows. The St. Louis Metropolitan Community Church is also in Soulard.

Carondelet 
Several gay bars line South Broadway in the Carondelet neighborhood. It is also the original home of the Sisters of St. Joseph of Carondelet who were early advocates for LGBT inclusion and continue to actively support the transgender community.

Metro East
The former glory of the East St. Louis nightclub scene included bars that catered to LGBTQ clientele, including an active ballroom and drag scene. New bars and social institutions have since been established, and a small community is growing in Alton, Illinois. The first Alton Pride Fall Festival is to occur October 2020.

Organizations and community institutions

Community and advocacy 

 Pride St. Louis operates the Pride Center with year-round community events as well as the annual St. Louis PrideFest.
 PROMO is a statewide advocacy group for LGBTQ issues. The St. Louis office includes the local Services & Advocacy for GLBT Elders (SAGE) affiliate.
 The Metro Trans Umbrella Group (MTUG) is a non-profit providing social and emotional support to the transgender community and promotes advocacy, education, and visibility in the St. Louis metro area.
 Local TransParent chapters support families of transgender children and teenagers with monthly support groups and social events.
Growing American Youth is a social support organization for LGBTQA youth under 21 in the region.
The St. Louis PFLAG chapter was established in 1977. Their meetings are open to parents, family members, and LGBT community members.
ACLU of Missouri has a dedicated Transgender Education and Advocacy Program supporting civil rights for transgender Missourians.
St. Louis LGBTQ Chamber of Commerce, formerly the Gateway Business Guild, is an affiliate of the National LGBT Chamber of Commerce and arranges networking opportunities for LGBT professionals and businesses.
The St. Louis LGBT History Project partners with archives and museums to collect and preserve community history.
The St. Louis Queer+ Support Helpline (SQSH) is a resource helpline for community queer support.

Recreation 

 There are a number of sports clubs and leagues that serve or align with the St. Louis community. Team St. Louis organizes various leagues and works with the international Gay Games. Other popular sports among the community include softball, swimming, rugby, cycling, bowling, darts, and others.
 St. Louis has a history of illustrious ball culture and drag performance that continues to thrive. It is said to be among the ballroom top ten cities in the US.
Community oriented choirs include the CHARIS Women's Chorus and the Gateway Men's Chorus. BandTogether is a community centered band and color guard.

Health 

 St. Louis Effort for AIDS is a non-profit AIDS Service Organization providing education and support services for those impacted.
 Rustin's Place, named after civil rights activist Bayard Rustin, is a community center focused on supporting the Black LGBT community in areas of education, wellness, and community.
Steps Alano is an LGBT affirming center that hosts 12 step recovery programs in Tower Grove South.
The Transgender Center at St. Louis Children's Hospital supports transgender youth, employing specialists with backgrounds in medical care, mental health, education, and social support.

Media

Ongoing 

 Vital Voice magazine started publishing June 2000 following the 1999 closure of the Lesbian and Gay News Telegraph.
 #Boom Magazine was founded in 2014 and partners with the Gateway Business Guild and LGBTQ Nation.
 Out in STL is a queer magazine for all of St. Louis. It covers news, politics, people, and trends relevant to St. Louis's LGBTQ communities.

Historical publications 

 Mandrake, organized by the Mandrake Society, was the first LGBT publication in St. Louis and ran from 1970-1972. Soon after, the Lesbian Alliance began publishing a newsletter entitled Moonstorm, which ran until 1980.

Notable people 

 Harriet Hosmer, the most distinguished female sculptor in the United States during the 19th century, attended Missouri Medical College.
 Internationally renowned circus performer Omar Kingsley, better known as Ella Zoyara, was born in St. Louis.
 20th-century author Emma Crow was born in St. Louis, where she began her relationship with Charlotte Cushman.
Josephine Baker, the performer, desegregation activist, and spy, was born in St. Louis. Her relationships with women are well-documented.
Fannie Hurst grew up in St. Louis and studied at Washington University in St. Louis, then went on to become an author, civil rights activist, and the host one of the first television shows to provide a mainstream platform for the gay community in the 1950s.
Sculptor and silverpoint artist Thelma Wood studied at Washington University in St. Louis. Djuna Barnes would go on to fictionalize their relationship in Nightwood, which is frequently considered one of the great Modernist novels, as well as one of the early prominent novels to explicitly depict a sexual relationship between women.
Tennessee Williams, famous playwright, moved to St. Louis as a child and graduated from University City High School.
William S. Burroughs, writer of the Beat Generation, grew up in St. Louis and attended John Burroughs School (allegedly no relation). Although his family provided a privileged suburban lifestyle, Burroughs sought out "seedier" aspects of the urban landscape, such as sewers, skid row, and frequent visits with sex workers. These impressions manifest in many of his works, and he was dismayed to see the "redeveloped" St. Louis on a return in 1965. He described the Arch grounds construction as "ominous... like the only landmark to survive an atomic blast."
Shane Cohn, current 25th ward Alderman of the City of St. Louis, was elected in 2009 and became the first openly LGBTQ+ elected official in the city's government.  
Lea DeLaria, actress widely known for her role in Orange Is the New Black, grew up in Belleville, Illinois and attended the first Pride in St. Louis. She was arrested for "open and notorious homosexuality" in Missouri and spent a night in jail.
Mike Colona, former Missouri House Representative, was appointed Associate Circuit Judge by Governor Mike Parson. As Representative, Colona unsuccessfully introduced bills to legalize same-sex marriage and to secede St. Louis from the state of Missouri.
Maxi Glamour, a non-binary drag artist who competed on The Boulet Brothers' Dragula, started their drag career in St. Louis and is an organizer for queer community building and political education.
V. E. Schwab, fantasy author, lived in St. Louis while studying at Washington University in St. Louis.

External links 

St. Louis LGBT History Project
Mapping LGBTQ St. Louis, 1945 - 1992
LGBT History - Archive Sources library.wustl.edu
Marching with Pride Timeline library.wustl.edu
St. Louis Lesbian History

References 

 
LGBT in Missouri